TPC Treviso Bay is a private golf club located within the gated community of Treviso Bay in Naples, Florida.

The 18-hole championship golf course was designed by Arthur Hills in consultation with Hal Sutton. It opened in 2008 and is a member of the Tournament Players Club network operated by the PGA Tour. In 2009 it was the venue for the annual The ACE Group Classic, a tournament on the Champions Tour.

References

External links

 New Homes at Treviso Bay

Buildings and structures in Naples, Florida
Golf clubs and courses in Florida
2008 establishments in Florida